"Hey Cinderella" is a song co-written and recorded by American country music artist Suzy Bogguss.  It was released in November 1993 as the second single from her album Something Up My Sleeve. The song reached number 5 on the Billboard Hot Country Singles & Tracks chart in February 1994. The single also entered the UK singles chart, reaching number 92 on September 25, 1993. It was written by Bogguss, Matraca Berg and Gary Harrison.

Chart performance

Year-end charts

References

1993 singles
1993 songs
Songs based on fairy tales
Suzy Bogguss songs
Songs written by Matraca Berg
Song recordings produced by Jimmy Bowen
Liberty Records singles
Songs written by Gary Harrison